Sujit Barman Roy (born 28 January 1945) was an Indian judge and former Chief Justice of Orissa High Court.

Career
Sujit Barman Roy studied in Patha Bhavana, Santiniketan under the Visva Bharati University. He graduated from Maharaja Bir Bikram College of Tripura. In 1974, he passed LL.B. from Hazra Law College, University of Calcutta and started practice at Agartala Bench under the Gauhati High Court. Barman Roy became the Advocate General of Tripura in 1988. On 14 November 1991 he was appointed a permanent judge of the Gauhati High Court. In 1997 Justice Barman Roy was transferred to the Calcutta High Court thereafter elevated to the post of Chief Justice of Orissa High Court in 2003. He retired from the post in January 2007.

References

1945 births
Living people
Judges of the Gauhati High Court
Judges of the Calcutta High Court
Chief Justices of the Orissa High Court
University of Calcutta alumni
People associated with Santiniketan